The Diocese of Peterborough is a Latin Church ecclesiastical territory or diocese of the Catholic Church in Ontario, Canada. It is a suffragan in the ecclesiastical province of the metropolitan Archdiocese of Kingston, Ontario.

Its episcopal see is the Cathedral of St. Peter-in-Chains in Peterborough, Ontario. 
On March 10, 2017, Pope Francis named former Hamilton Auxiliary Bishop Daniel J. Miehm as the new Bishop of Peterborough.

History 
Established on 25 January 1874 as Apostolic Vicariate of Northern Canada, on territory split off from the Diocese of Kingston in Ontario, the Diocese of Peterborough was first established July 11, 1882 by Pope Leo XIII.

Statistics and extent 
As per 2014, it pastorally served 61,700 Catholics (13.8% of 447,000 total) on 25,900 km2 in 40 parishes and a mission with 69 priests (56 diocesan, 13 religious), 8 deacons, 92 lay religious (13 brothers, 79 sisters) and 3 seminarians.

As of 2006, the diocese contained 88,741 Catholics in 43 parishes, 104 priests, 9 religious priests, 101 Women Religious and 12 deacons.

The Diocese of Peterborough includes the  Muskoka and Parry Sound Districts, the counties of Peterborough, Northumberland, and Victoria, that portion of the Regional District of Durham which formally was the County of Durham and five townships of the County of Haliburton.

Bishops
(all Roman Rite)

Apostolic Vicar of Northern Canada 
 Jean-François Jamot (born France) (3 February 1874 - 11 July 1882 see below), Titular Bishop of Sarepta (1874.02.03 – 1882.07.11)

Suffragan Bishops of Peterborough
 Jean-François Jamot (see above 11 July 1882 - death 4 May 1886)
 Thomas Joseph Dowling (14 December 1886 - 11 January 1889); next Bishop of Hamilton (Ontario, Canada) (1889.01.11 – death 1924.08.06)
 Richard Alphonsus O’Connor (born Ireland) (11 January 1889 - death 23 January 1913)
 Richard Michael Joseph O'Brien (20 June 1913 - 17 May 1929), next Titular Archbishop of Amorium (1929.05.17 – 1938.02.23) as Coadjutor Archbishop of Kingston (1929.05.17 – 1938.02.23), succeeding as Metropolitan Archbishop of Kingston (Ontario, Canada) (1938.02.23 – death 1943.08.30)
 Dennis P. O'Connor (30 January 1930 - death 30 August 1942)
 John Roderick MacDonald (5 June 1943 - 14 April 1945), next Titular Bishop of Ancusa (1945.04.14 – 1950.04.13) as Coadjutor Bishop of Antigonish (Canada) (1945.04.14 – 1950.04.13), succeeding as Bishop of Antigonish (1950.04.13 – death 1959.12.18)
 Joseph Gerald Berry (7 April 1945 - 28 November 1953), next Metropolitan Archbishop of Halifax (Canada) (1953.11.28 – 1967.05.12) and President of Canadian Conference of Catholic Bishops (1960 – 1964)
 Benjamin Ibberson Webster (born England) (24 April 1954 - retired 12 March 1968), previously Titular Bishop of Paphus (1946.09.24 – 1954.04.24) as Auxiliary Bishop of Toronto (Ontario, Canada) (1946.09.24 – 1954.04.24); emeritate as Titular Bishop of Tigamibena (1968.03.12 – death 1981.01.18)
 Francis Anthony Marrocco (10 June 1968 - death 18 July 1975), previously Titular Bishop of Limnæ (in Pisidia) (1955.12.01 – 1968.06.10) as Auxiliary Bishop of Toronto (Ontario, Canada) (1955.12.01 – 1968.06.10)
 James Leonard Doyle (24 May 1976 - retired 28 December 2002), died 2004
 Nicola De Angelis (born Italy) (28 December 2002 - retired April 2014), previously Titular Bishop of Remesiana (1992.04.27 – 2002.12.28) as Auxiliary Bishop of Toronto (Ontario, Canada) (1992.04.27 – 2002.12.28)
 William Terrence McGrattan (April 2014 - 4 January 2017), previously Titular Bishop of Furnos minor (2009.11.06 – 2014.04.08) as Auxiliary Bishop of Toronto (Ontario, Canada) (2009.11.06 – 2014.04.08); Bishop of Calgary (Alberta, Canada) (4 January 2017 – ...).
 Daniel J. Miehm (10 March 2017 - ...), previously Titular Bishop of Gor (20 February 2013 - 10 March 2017) as Auxiliary Bishop of Hamilton (Ontario, Canada) (20 February 2013 - 10 March 2017).

Other priests of this diocese who became bishops
 David Joseph Scollard, appointed Bishop of Sault Sainte Marie, Ontario in 1904
 Michael Mulhall, appointed Bishop of Pembroke, Ontario in 2007

See also 
 List of Catholic dioceses in Canada

References

Sources and external links 
 Diocese of Peterborough website

 GCatholic, with Google map and satellite photo - data for all sections
 Diocese of Peterborough page at catholichierarchy.org retrieved August 2, 2006
 the Catholic Encyclopedia

 
Religious organizations established in 1882
Organizations based in Peterborough
Roman Catholic dioceses and prelatures established in the 19th century
 1882 establishments in Ontario